Hunger is a 2010 young adult novel by Jackie Morse Kessler.

Plot
An anorexic teenage girl is given the duties of Famine, of the Four Horsemen of the Apocalypse.

Reception
Kirkus Reviews said, the author's "ear for dialogue, fluid prose and dark humor elevate this brief novel above other 'issue books'".  Library Media Connection said that the author's "experience with bulimia brings realism to the topic", and that "the mix of fantasy and action makes this short novel... compelling reading, especially for reluctant readers".  Jenny of Wondrous Reads found it "...brilliant."

See also
Eating disorder

References

Young adult fantasy novels
American young adult novels
2010 fantasy novels
2010 American novels
Houghton Mifflin books